Noble is a 2014 film written and directed by Stephen Bradley about the true life story of Christina Noble, a children's rights campaigner, charity worker and writer, who founded the Christina Noble Children's Foundation in 1989. It stars Deirdre O'Kane, Sarah Greene, Brendan Coyle, Mark Huberman and Ruth Negga.

Plot 
The film is set in Vietnam in 1989, fourteen years after the end of the war. Christina Noble flies into Ho Chi Minh City (formerly Saigon), a country "that she wouldn't be able to show you on a map". With a few dollars, her own hard-won courage, she is about embark on a life calling. The film explores her tough upbringing in Dublin and her early adult life in the UK.  It is the inspirational true story of a woman who believes that it only takes one person to make a difference.

Cast 
 Deirdre O'Kane as Christina Noble
 Sarah Greene as Middle Christina
 Gloria Cramer Curtis as Young Christina
 Brendan Coyle as Gerry Shaw
 Mark Huberman as David Somers
 Nhu Quynh Nguyen as Madame Linh
 Ruth Negga as Joan
 David Mumeni as Mario
 Liam Cunningham as Thomas
 Kinh Quoc Nguyen as Trung
 Pauline McLynn as Mother Superior
 Eva Birthistle as Sister Laura
 Paul Hickey as Father O'Leary
 Matt Sipprell as European Investor

Production 
Production began in Vietnam in January 2013 and finished in the United Kingdom.  Post-production took place in London.

Release 
Noble premiered at the Santa Barbara International Film Festival on 31 January 2014, and it opened theatrically in Ireland on 19 September 2014.

Reception 
On review aggregator website Rotten Tomatoes, the film holds an approval rating of 81% based on 32 reviews, and an average rating of 6.5/10. The website's critical consensus reads, "Noble is undeniably and impassioned, even if it sometimes goes overboard in trying to prove its real-life protagonist lives up to its title." On Metacritic, the film has a weighted average score of 63 out of 100, based on 8 critics, indicating "generally favorable reviews". Donald Clarke of The Irish Times rated it 3/5 stars and wrote, "Fuelled by excellent performances, Noble has an uncomplicated integrity to it that will warm even the most resistant heart." Justin Lowe of The Hollywood Reporter called it "a joyful and rousing affirmation of the human spirit".

Awards

References

External links 
 
 

2014 films
Films set in Vietnam
Irish drama films
British drama films
Vietnamese-language films
2014 drama films
Vietnamese drama films
2010s British films